Dentitruncus is a genus of parasitic worms belonging to the family Illiosentidae.

Species:

Dentitruncus truttae

References

Illiosentidae
Acanthocephala genera